Sancho I of Portugal, nicknamed "the Populator", King of Portugal (Coimbra, 11 November 115426 March 1211) was the second but only surviving legitimate son and fifth child of Afonso I of Portugal by his wife, Maud of Savoy. Sancho succeeded his father and was crowned in Coimbra when he was 31 years old on 9 December 1185. He used the title King of Silves from 1189 until he lost the territory to Almohad control in 1191.

Early life 

Sancho was baptized with the name Martin (Martinho) since he was born on the feast day of Saint Martin of Tours. On 15 August 1170, he was knighted by his father, King Afonso I, and from then on he became his second in command, both administratively and militarily. At this time, the independence of Portugal (declared in 1139) was not firmly established. The kings of León and Castile were trying to re-annex the country and the Roman Catholic Church was late in giving its blessing and approval. Due to this situation Afonso I had to search for allies within the Iberian Peninsula. Portugal made an alliance with the Crown of Aragon and together they fought Castile and León. To secure the agreement, Sancho married Dulce, younger sister of King Alfonso II of Aragon, in 1174. Aragon was thus the first Iberian kingdom to recognize the independence of Portugal.

Reign 
With the death of Afonso I in 1185, Sancho I became the second king of Portugal. Coimbra was the centre of his kingdom; Sancho terminated the exhausting and generally pointless wars against his neighbours for control of the Galician borderlands. Instead, he turned all his attentions to the south. With the help of some soldiers on their way to join the Third Crusade, he sacked Alvor and took Silves in 1189, an event recounted in detail by an eyewitness in De itinere navali. Silves was an important city of the South, an administrative and commercial town with population estimates around 20,000 people. Sancho ordered the fortification of the city and built a castle which is today an important monument of Portuguese heritage. At the time he also styled himself "By the Grace of God, King of Portugal and Silves (Dei Gratiæ, Rex Portugalliæ et Silbis). 
However, military attention soon had to be turned again to the North, where León and Castile threatened again the Portuguese borders. Silves was again lost to the Moors in 1191.

Sancho I dedicated much of his reign to political and administrative organization of the new kingdom. He accumulated a national treasure, supported new industries and the middle class of merchants. Moreover, he created several new towns and villages (like Guarda in 1199) and took great care in populating remote areas in the northern Christian regions of Portugal – hence the nickname "the Populator". The king was also known for his love of knowledge and literature. Sancho I wrote several books of poems and used the royal treasure to send Portuguese students to European universities. He died in Coimbra, aged 56.

Marriage and issue
Sancho married Dulce of Aragon, daughter of Ramon Berenguer IV, Count of Barcelona and Petronilla, Queen of Aragon. Eleven children were born from this marriage, eight of whom reached adulthood:

 Theresa (1175/117618 June 1250), became the wife of King Alfonso IX of León and was beatified in 1705;
 Sancha (118013 March 1229), founded the Monastery of Celas near Coimbra where she lived until her death. Her sister Theresa arranged for her burial at the Monastery of Lorvão. She was beatified by Pope Clement XI in 1705, the same year as Theresa;
 Constanza (May 1182before 1186 or August 1202). According to Rodrigues Oliveira, she must have died before 1186 since her name is not registered in any of the documents of the chancellery of Sancho I which begins in that year. However, the necrology of São Salvador de Moreira records the death "III Nonas Augusti" in 1202 of "Domna Constantia Infantula filia regis domni Sancii et reginæ domnæ Dulciæ";
 Afonso (23 April 118625 March 1223), succeeded his father as the third king of Portugal;
 Raimundo (1187/889 March bef. 1188/89), died in infancy;
 Peter (23 February 11872 June 1258), married Aurembiaix, countess of Urgell;
 Ferdinand (24 March 118827 July 1233), count through his marriage to Joan, Countess of Flanders;
 Henry (aft. March 11898 Dec aft. 1189), died in infancy;
 Mafalda (1195/11961 May 1256), married Henry I of Castile and was beatified in 1793;
 Branca (119817 November 1240), probably the twin sister of Berengaria, was raised in the court with her father and his mistress "a Ribeirinha" and, when she was eight or ten years old, was sent to live with her sisters at the Monastery of Lorvão. She was a nun at a convent in Guadalajara and was buried at the same monastery as her mother;
 Berengaria (119827 March 1221), probably the twin sister of Branca, married Valdemar II of Denmark in 1214.

Children out of wedlock
With Maria Aires de Fornelos, daughter of Aires Nunes de Fornelos and Maior Pais, who was buried at the Monastery of Santo Tirso in accordance with her last will, Sancho had two children, both born before his marriage to Dulce of Aragon:
 Martim Sanches (born before 1175) Count of Trastámara. Martim married Elo Pérez de Castro, daughter of Pedro Fernández de Castro, with no issue from this marriage;
 Urraca Sanches (born before 1175), was married to Lourenço Soares, son of Soeiro Viegas and Sancha Bermúdez de Traba.
After Dulce's death, he had an affair with María Pais de Ribeira "a Ribeiriña" for whom he is often said to have written and dedicated a cantiga de amigo, A Ribeirinha, composed in 1199, the oldest text known in Portuguese poetry. That is contested nowadays by the Portuguese historian António de Resende Oliveira, who claims this cantiga was composed by Alfonso X of Castile or perhaps Sancho II of Portugal. At least six children were born of this relationship: 
 Rodrigo Sanches (died 1245), had a bastard son with Constança Afonso de Cambra called Afonso Rodrigues, a Franciscan friar and the "Guardian of the Convent of Lisbon";
 Gil Sanches (died on 14 September 1236), a cleric and troubadour, his father left him 8,000 morabetinos in his will. Gil granted fueros to the settlers of Sardezas in 1213;
 Nuno Sanches, died during childhood on a 16 December in an unknown year. He could have been the son of Maria Aires de Fornelos;
 Maior Sanches, also died at an early age on 27 August of an unknown year;
 Teresa Sanches, her father left her 7,000 morabetinos in his will. She was the second wife of Alfonso Téllez de Meneses whom she married before 1220 and with whom she had issue;
 Constança Sanches (12048 August 1269). Her father left her 7,000 morabetinos in his will. She was the godmother of her grand-niece Infanta Sancha and left her half of Vila do Conde, Avelaneda, Pousadela, Parada and Maçãs. She also owned estates in Torres Vedras.

Sancho had a son with Maria Moniz de Ribeira, daughter of Munio Osorio, tenente of the comarca of Cabreira and Ribera, and of Maria Nunes of Grijó:
 Pedro Moniz, who married a woman whose name is not recorded, and was the father of Maria Peres de Cabreira, the wife of Martim Peres Machado, the first to use the last name Machado.

Notes

References

Bibliography 

 

 
 
 
 
 

Portuguese infantes
12th-century Portuguese poets
Portuguese male poets
House of Burgundy-Portugal
1154 births
1211 deaths
People of the Reconquista
People from Coimbra
12th-century Portuguese monarchs
13th-century Portuguese monarchs
Portuguese people of Spanish descent
Portuguese people of French descent
Portuguese people of Italian descent